Bisenius is a surname. Notable people with the surname include:

Joe Bisenius (born 1982),  American baseball player and scout
Stephen W. Bisenius (born 1947), American politician